Passage GAA may refer to:

Passage GAA (Waterford) a sports club in Passage East, Ireland
Passage West GAA, a sports club in County Cork, Ireland